The 1996 NBL season was the 15th season of the National Basketball League. Only one change occurred heading into the 1996 season, with Waitakere leaving the NBL for the second-tiered Conference Basketball League (CBL). Auckland won the championship in 1996 to claim their fourth league title. In the best-of-three championship series, Nelson took Game 1 110–95, before Auckland came back to take Game 2 109–98 and Game 3 94–90.

Final standings

Season awards
 NZ Most Valuable Player: Phill Jones (Nelson)
 Most Outstanding Guard: Tony Bennett (North Harbour)
 Most Outstanding NZ Guard: Phill Jones (Nelson)
 Most Outstanding Forward: Ed Book (Palmerston North)
 Most Outstanding NZ Forward/Centre: Pero Cameron (Auckland)
 Scoring Champion: Ed Book (Palmerston North)
 Rebounding Champion: Jeff Daniels (North Harbour)
 Assist Champion: Scott Stewart (Canterbury)
 Rookie of the Year: Paora Winitana (North Harbour)
 Coach of the Year: Nenad Vučinić (Nelson)
 All-Star Five:
 G: Tony Bennett (North Harbour)
 G: Phill Jones (Nelson)
 F: Darryl Johnson (Hutt Valley)
 F: Pero Cameron (Auckland)
 C: Ed Book (Palmerston North)

References

National Basketball League (New Zealand) seasons
1996 in New Zealand basketball